Tooncast is a Latin American pay television channel owned by Warner Bros. Discovery through its International division. It was launched on 1 December 2008; its programming consists of classical animation, both from Hanna-Barbera, Warner Bros. Animation and Cartoon Network. The channel is a commercial-free service.

History
The channel was launched on 1 December 2008, after all classic animation programming from Warner Bros., Hanna-Barbera and MGM were removed from Boomerang Latin America, to center the network towards the teen audience, and replacing it with live-action programming instead.

Tooncast follows the Boomerang US old channel line-up, which aired classic cartoons. Old Cartoon Network commercials are also broadcast on the channel, such as "Cartoons That Never Made It", Cartoon Network Groovies and Boomerang Shorties. Unlike other channels of Turner Broadcasting System Latin America, few pay-TV providers carry Tooncast. The only exception is Brazil, where the channel is available on most subscription TV providers, such as Oi TV, Claro TV, GVT TV, Vivo TV, Kiwisat and Nossa TV. Since 1 August 2014, Tooncast began to be carried on NET, the biggest cable television company in Brazil.

Even though Tooncast remained with a single pan-regional feed with audio tracks in Spanish, Brazilian Portuguese and English, in November 2012 the channel started using the Brazilian content rating system. 

On 26 September 2018, the channel was picked up by Sky Brasil.

On 1 April 2019, all classic programming from the Turner animation library, including productions from Warner Bros., Hanna-Barbera and MGM, were removed from the schedule making focus on Cartoon Network original productions, and also airing anime series like Pokémon and the Brazilian animated series Monica and Friends, following WarnerMedia's business restructure, that also affected programming on sister networks like Cartoon Network and Boomerang. However, it eventually returned from 1 June–1 July 2019 and they have recently been reinstated. The cartoons of Hanna-Barbera, Warner Bros. and MGM returned to the programming in June, however, that change was made again in July of the same year, and then returned in January 2020, where they were included for the first time in the program channel such as Batman Beyond, Teen Titans and ThunderCats.

On 1 June 2021, the channel's programming underwent a drastic change, being greatly reduced compared to previous months; However, this reduction in programs is also accompanied by some new releases. It is speculated that these changes came as an effect of the launch in Latin America of the streaming service HBO Max.

On 1 December 2022, after more than a year of being with the same programming, Tooncast changed its programming again, but withdrawing the series from Hanna-Barbera, Warner Bros. and DC and focusing again on Cartoon Network Studios series, but with this change, programming was further reduced.

Programming

Current programming
As of March 2023

 Camp Lazlo
 Chowder
 Foster's Home for Imaginary Friends
 Grim & Evil
 Hi Hi Puffy AmiYumi
 Generator Rex
 I Am Weasel
 The Marvelous Misadventures of Flapjack
 Mike, Lu & Og
 My Gym Partner's a Monkey
 Sym-Bionic Titan
 Time Squad
 Whatever Happened to... Robot Jones?
 Zuzubalândia

Former programming

 2 Stupid Dogs
 The Addams Family
 The Archie Show
 Animaniacs
 The Ant and the Aardvark
 The Atom Ant/Secret Squirrel Show
 Augie Doggie and Doggie Daddy
 A Pup Named Scooby-Doo
 As Aventuras de Gui & Estopa
 Atomic Betty
 Baby Looney Tunes
 The Batman
 Batman Beyond
 Batman: The Animated Series
 Birdman and the Galaxy Trio
 Cartoon Cartoons
 Casper and Friends
 Cow and Chicken
 Courage The Cowardly Dog
 Crazylegs Crane
 Captain Planet
 The Centurions
 Dastardly and Muttley in Their Flying Machines
 Dragon Ball
 Dexter's Laboratory
 Duck Dodgers
 Dynomutt, Dog Wonder
 Ed, Edd n Eddy
 Evil Con Carne
 Fantastic Four
 Fantastic Four: World's Greatest Heroes
 Fat Albert and the Cosby Kids
 Felix the Cat
 The Flintstones
 The Flintstone Kids
 Freakazoid!
 Garfield and Friends
 The Grim Adventures of Billy & Mandy
 Haunted Tales for Wicked Kids
 He-Man and the Masters of the Universe
 Help!... It's the Hair Bear Bunch!
 The Herculoids
 Hong Kong Phooey
 Huckleberry Hound
 The Inspector
 The Jetsons
 Johnny Bravo
 Jonny Quest
 Jorel's Brother
 Josie and the Pussycats
 Justice League
 Justice League Unlimited
 Krypto the Superdog
 Laff-A-Lympics
 Legion of Super Heroes
 The Life and Times of Juniper Lee
 The Little Lulu Show
 Loonatics Unleashed
 Looney Tunes
 Magilla Gorilla
 ¡Mucha Lucha!
 MGM Cartoons
 Monica's Gang
 My Little Pony
 The New Yogi Bear Show
 The New Scooby-Doo Movies
 The New Scooby and Scrappy-Doo Show
 Oggy and the Cockroaches
 The Perils of Penelope Pitstop
 The Pink Panther
 Pink Panther and Sons
 The Pink Panther Show
 Pink Panther and Pals
 Pinky and The Brain
 Pixie and Dixie and Mr. Jinks
 Pokémon
 Popeye
 The Powerpuff Girls
 Quick Draw McGraw
 The Rocky and Bullwinkle Show
 Samurai Jack
 Secret Squirrel
 Shaggy & Scooby-Doo Get a Clue!
 The Real Adventures of Jonny Quest
 Scooby-Doo, Where Are You!
 Scooby-Doo and Scrappy-Doo
 The Scooby-Doo Show
 Sheep in the Big City
 She-Ra: Princess of Power
 Sítio do Picapau Amarelo
 The Smurfs
 Snagglepuss
 Space Ghost/Dino Boy in the Lost Valley
 Static Shock
 Super Friends
 Superman: The Animated Series
 The Sylvester & Tweety Mysteries
 The Secret Saturdays
 Squirrel Boy Taz-Mania Teen Titans
 ThunderCats
 Top Cat
 Tom and Jerry
 Tom and Jerry Kids
 Tom and Jerry Tales
 Trunk Train
 Wacky Races
 Wally Gator
 What a Cartoon!
 X-Men Evolution
 Yogi Bear
 Yogi's Gang
 Young Justice
 The Zeta Project

References

External links
 

Cartoon Network
Warner Bros. Discovery Americas
Television channels and stations established in 2008
Warner Bros. Discovery networks
Commercial-free television networks
Classic television networks